Lowaldo van der Merwe (born 24 December 1986) is a Namibian cricketer. He is a right-handed batsman and right-arm medium-pace bowler. He was born in Paarl.

Van der Merwe made his first-class debut for the side against Easterns in October 2009, scoring 20 runs in the only innings in which he batted.

Later in the month he made his List A debut, against Easterns.

References

External links
Lowaldo van der Merwe at CricketArchive 

1986 births
Living people
Sportspeople from Paarl
Namibian cricketers